Wrestling is the debut album by English-Australian singer and producer Kučka. It was released on 30 April 2021 via LuckyMe and Soothsayer. It was preceded by the release of singles "Drowning" and "Real" in 2019, "Contemplation", and "Ascension" in 2020, and "No Good for Me" and "Eternity" in 2021. The album cover and the singles' music videos were shot and directed by Kučka's wife and creative director, Dillon Howl.

The album features co-production from Australian musician and longtime collaborator Flume, British producer Vegyn, American producer Nosaj Thing, and UK duo Exmoor Emperor.

At the AIR Awards of 2022, the album was nominated for Best Independent Dance or Electronica Album or EP.

Background
Kučka signed to British label LuckyMe in 2017, after issuing previous releases via independent Australian labels.

Initially, the plan was to release Wrestling by the end of 2020, but it was pushed back to 2021 for unstated reasons.

Kučka states that she had to say no to multiple collaborations, including one with South Korean boy band BTS, in order to finish work on the record.

In an interview with Queued in March 2020, Kučka shared details on the track "Eternity", which the interviewer described as "her most meaningful song to date". She wrote the song three weeks before meeting her wife, Dillon Howl:
On 2 April, Kučka shared a free download link to "Joyride" on her website, accessible by pre-saving the album.

Reception

Mathias Pageau of Exclaim! said Wrestling "might soon cement her pop star status" and praised Kučka for "again and again prov[ing] her talent for complex hooks and catchy melodies". Leigh Hill of OUTinPerth praised the album for her voice and futuristic sound. They also called her album "the result of a tough but fruitful transition in her life, spanning love, conflict, sexuality and maturity".

Track listing
All tracks written and produced by Kučka, except where noted.

Release history

References

Notes

External links
 

2021 debut albums
Kučka albums
Albums produced by Flume (musician)
Albums produced by Kučka
Albums produced by Nosaj Thing
Albums produced by Vegyn